Tai-Shan Schierenberg (born 1962) is a British portrait painter, based in London. He was the joint winner of the 1989 BP Portrait Award and is Head of Painting at the Art Academy in London.

Early life and career
Tai-Shan Schierenberg was born in England in 1962, the eldest of three sons to a Chinese mother and a German father who was a painter. As a child, Tai-Shan spent the first years of his life with his grandparents in Malaysia but was eventually returned to his London-based parents for primary school.

Being taken on frequent visits to the London Museums or art galleries made Tai-Shan familiar with painting of all realms and ages, while drawing soon became his favourite activity. After travels to Greece and Asia Minor, the family settled in the Black Forest and, in pursuit of a more ecologically centred life, did some subsistence farming. Tai-Shan attended a Jesuit-run grammar school nearby. He started painting in oils in his mid-teens.

At the age of seventeen and with his secondary education completed, he left home, travelled to Frankfurt and Amsterdam, and spent time in Paris, drawing from life at the Académie de la Grande Chaumière.

Schierenberg eventually returned to London, where he has lived ever since. He applied to and was accepted by St. Martin's and in due course, Slade School of Art for postgraduate studies, which he finished in 1987.

In 1989 he won joint first prize in the National Portrait Gallery's John Player Portrait Award, and as part of the prize, was commissioned to paint the portrait of playwright John Mortimer for the Gallery's collection. The National Portrait Gallery also holds his portraits of Lord Carrington from 1994, Lord Sainsbury 2002 and most recently Seamus Heaney from 2004. He has also executed the commission for a double portrait of the Royal Couple. His paintings can be seen at Flowers East in Hackney.

Tai Shan Schierenberg is Head of Painting at The Art Academy in London. Since 2013 he has been a judge on the television show Artist of the Year.

During the football season Schierenberg gained "unprecedented access" to West Bromwich Albion Football Club for the production of a Channel 4 documentary called ‘The Football Club’, which is part of the channel's ‘Artist in Residence’ series. Schierenberg sought "to understand what it was about the game that makes it so compelling", and whilst he began the project as a football cynic, he emerged as a fan of the club.

Bibliography
Packer, W. (2005) Tai-Shan Schierenberg. Momentum, London.

References

Further reading
 Tai-Shan Schierenberg: Video Interview Transcript
 Tai Shan Schierenberg – Men Without Women - exhibition review
 Another country, review in The Spectator by Laura Gascoigne

1962 births
Living people
Alumni of the Slade School of Fine Art
20th-century English painters
English male painters
21st-century English painters
BP Portrait Award winners
20th-century English male artists
21st-century English male artists